Spraygun War is an American electronic/rap band from Los Angeles, California. The group consists of members Josh Todd and Stevie D (Stevie Dacanay). The two are also members of the rock band Buckcherry. The band's debut recording, Into the Blackness, was released on June 10, 2016, without a label. It features their single, OMG, and was recorded entirely in E-standard tuning.

History

The band's debut recording, Into the Blackness, was released on June 10, 2016. Conceptually, the EP deals with Josh Todd's path to enlightenment.  It features their single, OMG.

Critical reception
The majority of the critical response towards Spraygun War has been coarse. Website MetalSucks referred to them as "terrible".

Band members

Josh Todd – lead vocals, piano, additional guitar (2015–present)
Stevie D. – rhythm and lead guitar, backing vocals (2015–present)

Discography 

 Into the Blackness (EP) (2016)
 OMG (Single) (2016)

References

External links

2016 establishments in California
Musical groups from Los Angeles
Dubstep music groups
American hip hop groups